Endless, Nameless may refer to:
 "Endless, Nameless" (song), a hidden track at the end of Nirvana's album Nevermind 
 Endless, Nameless (album), a 1997 album by British rock band the Wildhearts
 An item from the video game The Binding of Isaac.